Brunswick is a passenger rail station on the MARC Brunswick Line between Washington, D.C. and Martinsburg, West Virginia. The station house, located at 100 South Maple Street in Brunswick, Maryland, is a former Baltimore and Ohio Railroad depot that is a contributing property to the Brunswick Historic District, which has been listed on the National Register of Historic Places since August 29, 1979. The station was designed by Ephraim Francis Baldwin and opened in 1891 on Seventh Avenue. Several years later the building was moved to its current location.  It is a wooden frame building with stone walls up to the window sills, and features Palladian windows in the roof dormers.

Amtrak's former Blue Ridge previously served the station and eventually dropped the stop from its timetables. The Brunswick station was the final station in the CSX System to eliminate human ticket agents. Barb Eichelberger, the last employee of her kind in the entire system, retired in June 2010.

Station layout
Brunswick features a unique station layout in which the westbound and eastbound tracks are separated by the station's parking lot. The station house is located just north of a platform serving the Martinsburg-bound trains, while two side platforms south of the parking lot serve Washington-bound trains.

Gallery

References

External links

 Brunswick station official website
 Station from Petersville Road from Google Maps Street View

Brunswick Line
Railway stations on the National Register of Historic Places in Maryland
Former Amtrak stations in Maryland
Former Baltimore and Ohio Railroad stations
MARC Train stations
Historic district contributing properties in Maryland
Queen Anne architecture in Maryland
National Register of Historic Places in Frederick County, Maryland
Transportation buildings and structures in Frederick County, Maryland